Sarudu is an Austronesian language of West Sulawesi, Indonesia. It is closely related to (and reportedly mutually intelligible with) Uma.

References

Kaili–Pamona languages
Languages of Sulawesi